Mandala Airlines Flight 660 was a scheduled passenger flight on 24 July 1992 which crashed in Indonesia into a mountain on Ambon Island as it attempted to land at Pattimura Airport in a heavy thunderstorm. Pilot error and windshear were blamed for the crash.

Aircraft
The aircraft was a Vickers Viscount 816 serial number 434, which first flew on 8 June 1959. It was delivered on 17 June 1959 to Trans Australia Airlines and named McDouall Stuart after an Australian explorer. By 1974 it had been bought by Mandala Airlines with the registration PK-RVU and name Nias.

References

External links 
 

Aviation accidents and incidents in 1992
Aviation accidents and incidents in Indonesia
Airliner accidents and incidents caused by pilot error
Airliner accidents and incidents caused by microbursts
Accidents and incidents involving the Vickers Viscount
660
1992 in Indonesia
1992 meteorology
July 1992 events in Asia